Héctor Tizón (October 21, 1929 – July 30, 2012) was an Argentinian writer, journalist, lawyer, judge, and diplomat. Tizón served as the cultural attache in the Argentine Embassy in Mexico, and was forced into exile to Cercedilla in the Sierra de Guadarrama, west of Madrid, shortly after the military coup of March 24, 1976. Upon his return to Argentina, he settled back in Jujuy where he died on July 30, 2012. He won the Diamond Konex Award in 2004 as one of the most preeminent writers in Argentina.

Bibliography
A un costado de los rieles (1960)
Fuego en Casabindo (1969)
El cantar del profeta y el bandido (1972)
El jactancioso y la bella (1972)
Sota de bastos, caballo de espadas (1975)
El traidor venerado (1978)
La casa y el viento (1984)
Recuento (1984)
El viaje (1988)
El hombre que llegó a un pueblo (1988)
El gallo blanco (1992)
Luz de las crueles provincias (1995)
La mujer de Strasser (1997)
Tierra de frontera (1998)
Obra completa (1998)
Extraño y pálido fulgor (1999)
El viejo soldado (2002)
La belleza del mundo (2004)
No es posible callar (2004)
Cuentos completos (2006)
El resplandor de la hoguera (2008)
Memorial de la Puna

External References
 Vimeo

References

1929 births
2012 deaths
Argentine male novelists
Argentine exiles
Argentine diplomats
Argentine politicians
20th-century Argentine judges
20th-century Argentine novelists
20th-century Argentine male writers